"Hylarana" garoensis, commonly known as Boulenger's Garo hill frog, is a species of frog in the family Ranidae. Its natural habitats are subtropical or tropical moist lowland forests, subtropical or tropical moist shrubland, subtropical or tropical high-altitude grassland, and rivers; it is found in India and possibly Bangladesh. It is threatened by habitat loss.

References

garoensis
Frogs of India
Amphibians described in 1920
Taxonomy articles created by Polbot